Harold Scheub (August 26, 1931 – October 16, 2019) was an American Africanist, Evjue-Bascom Professor of Humanities Emeritus in the Department of African Languages and Literature (now the Department of African Cultural Studies) at the University of Wisconsin–Madison. Scheub has recorded and compiled oral literature from across southern Africa.

Early life and education
Born in Gary, Indiana, Scheub was aware as a child of racial segregation in Gary. His family, of German descent, experienced harassment during the Second World War. After attending a Lutheran grade school and local high school, Scheub worked in a local steel mill. He joined the US Air Force, serving as a jet mechanic. On leaving the Air Force he was able to take advantage of the G.I. Bill to fund his college education, and studied literature at the University of Michigan. After a master's degree there, he taught composition classes at Valparaiso University.

Teaching career 
Scheub taught for two years at Masindi Senior Secondary School in Masindi, Uganda. On his return to the United States, he taught again at Valparaiso. Becoming involved in the civil rights movement, he studied Swahili at UCLA in the summer of 1965. Philip Curtin invited Scheub to study for a PhD in the department of African languages and literature at the University of Wisconsin. He worked with Archibald Campbell Jordan, who encouraged him to study Xhosa and do fieldwork research in South Africa. He gained his PhD in 1969 with a thesis on the Ntsomi, a performing art practiced by Xhosa women. 
Political scientist Crawford Young offered Scheub a permanent position at Wisconsin, and he taught there for 43 years until his retirement in December 2013.

Scheub did not marry and had no children. He died October 16, 2019 in Madison, Wisconsin at age 88.

Works
 Bibliography of African oral narratives, 1971
 African images, 1972
 The Xhosa Ntsomi, 1975
 African oral narratives, proverbs, riddles, poetry, and song, 1977
 Story, 1988
 The African storyteller: stories from African oral traditions, 1990
 (with Nongenile Masithathu Zenani) The world and the word: tales and observations from the Xhosa oral tradition, 1992
 The tongue is fire: South African storytellers and apartheid, 1996
 A dictionary of African mythology: the mythmaker as storyteller, 2000
 The poem in the story: music, poetry, and narrative, 2002
 African tales, 2005
 The uncoiling python: South African storytellers and resistance, 2010
 Trickster and hero: two characters in the oral and written traditions of the world, 2012

References

1931 births
2019 deaths
Writers from Gary, Indiana
Military personnel from Indiana
American folklorists
African folklore
American Africanists
Valparaiso University faculty
University of Wisconsin–Madison faculty
University of Michigan College of Literature, Science, and the Arts alumni
 University of Wisconsin–Madison College of Letters and Science alumni
American people of German descent
Activists for African-American civil rights